This is a list of foreign Premier League goalscorers. The Premier League, which began in its current guise in 1992, has been represented by 114 foreign FIFA affiliated nations in total. As of February 2022, when Kosovan player Milot Rashica scored for Norwich City, 100 different foreign FIFA affiliated nations have been represented in the Premier League scorelist.

The following players meet both of the following two criteria:
Have scored at least one Premier League goal. Players who were contracted to Premier League clubs, but only scored in lower league, cup and/or European games, or did not score in competitive games at all, are not included.
Are considered foreign, i.e., outside the United Kingdom, determined by whether or not he is alleged to play for the national teams of England, Scotland, Wales or Northern Ireland, specifically,
If a player has been capped at international level, the national team is used; if he has been capped by more than one country, the highest level (or the most recent) team is used. These include British players with dual citizenship.
If a player has not been capped at international level, his country of birth is used, except those who were born abroad from British parents or moved to the United Kingdom at a young age, and those who clearly indicated to have switched his nationality to another nation.

Clubs listed are those for which the player has scored at least one Premier League goal.

In bold: Players who have scored at least one goal in the Premier League in the current season (2022–23), and are still at a club for which they have scored. This does not include current players of a Premier League club who have not scored a goal in the Premier League in the current season.

For each country, the leading scorer is indicated by the number of goals that he scored in the Premier League.

Details correct as of 18 March 2023.

Albania
Armando Broja – Southampton, Chelsea (7)

Algeria
Nadir Belhadj – Portsmouth
Ali Benarbia – Manchester City
Saïd Benrahma – West Ham United
Hameur Bouazza – Watford, Fulham
Sofiane Feghouli – West Ham United
Rachid Ghezzal – Leicester City
Kamel Ghilas – Hull City
Adlène Guedioura – Wolverhampton Wanderers
Riyad Mahrez – Leicester City, Manchester City (82)
Islam Slimani – Leicester City
Moussa Saïb – Tottenham Hotspur
Hassan Yebda – Portsmouth

Angola
Hélder Costa – Wolverhampton Wanderers, Leeds United (4)
Manucho – Hull City

Antigua and Barbuda
Dexter Blackstock – Southampton
Mikele Leigertwood – Crystal Palace, Reading (2)

Argentina

Sergio Agüero – Manchester City (184)
Carlos Alcaraz - Southampton
Julián Álvarez - Manchester City
Julio Arca – Sunderland, Middlesbrough
Christian Bassedas – Newcastle United
Emiliano Buendía – Norwich City, Aston Villa
Jonathan Calleri – West Ham United
Esteban Cambiasso – Leicester City
Horacio Carbonari – Derby County
Fabricio Coloccini – Newcastle United
Daniel Cordone – Newcastle United
Hernán Crespo – Chelsea
Andrés D'Alessandro – Portsmouth
Martín Demichelis – Manchester City
Ángel Di María – Manchester United
Franco Di Santo – Blackburn Rovers, Wigan Athletic
Alejandro Faurlín – Queens Park Rangers
Federico Fernández – Swansea City, Newcastle United
Mauro Formica – Blackburn Rovers
Juan Foyth – Tottenham Hotspur
Esteban Fuertes – Derby County
Ramiro Funes Mori – Everton
Alejandro Garnacho – Manchester United
Jonás Gutiérrez – Newcastle United
Gabriel Heinze – Manchester United
Gonzalo Higuaín – Chelsea
Erik Lamela – Tottenham Hotspur
Manuel Lanzini – West Ham United
Giovani Lo Celso – Tottenham Hotspur
Alexis Mac Allister – Brighton & Hove Albion
Carlos Marinelli – Middlesbrough
Lisandro Martínez – Manchester United
Javier Mascherano –  Liverpool
Juan Carlos Menseguez – West Bromwich Albion
Nicolás Otamendi – Manchester City
Sixto Peralta – Ipswich Town
Roberto Pereyra – Watford
Maxi Rodríguez – Liverpool
Marcos Rojo – Manchester United
Cristian Romero – Tottenham Hotspur
Facundo Sava – Fulham
Marcos Senesi – Bournemouth
Denis Stracqualursi – Everton
Mauricio Taricco – Tottenham Hotspur
Carlos Tevez – West Ham United, Manchester United, Manchester City
Leonardo Ulloa – Leicester City, Brighton & Hove Albion
Juan Sebastián Verón – Manchester United, Chelsea
Luciano Vietto – Fulham
Emanuel Villa – Derby County
Claudio Yacob – West Bromwich Albion
Pablo Zabaleta – Manchester City
Mauro Zárate – Birmingham City, West Ham United

Armenia
Henrikh Mkhitaryan – Manchester United, Arsenal (13)

Australia
John Aloisi – Coventry City
Tim Cahill – Everton
Brett Emerton – Blackburn Rovers
Hayden Foxe – Portsmouth
Richard Garcia – Hull City
Chris Herd – Aston Villa
Brett Holman – Aston Villa
Mile Jedinak – Crystal Palace
Richard Johnson – Watford
Harry Kewell – Leeds United, Liverpool
Stan Lazaridis – West Ham United, Birmingham City
Aaron Mooy – Huddersfield Town, Brighton & Hove Albion
Lucas Neill – Blackburn Rovers, West Ham United
Paul Okon – Middlesbrough
Robbie Slater – West Ham United, Southampton
Danny Tiatto – Manchester City
Mark Viduka – Leeds United, Middlesbrough, Newcastle United (92)

Austria
Marko Arnautović – Stoke City, West Ham United (43)
Christian Fuchs – Leicester City
Valentino Lazaro – Newcastle United
Stefan Maierhofer – Wolverhampton Wanderers
Emanuel Pogatetz – Middlesbrough
Sebastian Prödl – Watford
Paul Scharner – Wigan Athletic, West Bromwich Albion
Andreas Weimann – Aston Villa

Barbados
Emmerson Boyce – Wigan Athletic (11)
Gregory Goodridge – Queens Park Rangers

Belarus
Alexander Hleb – Arsenal, Birmingham City (8)

Belgium

Philippe Albert – Newcastle United
Toby Alderweireld – Southampton, Tottenham Hotspur
Michy Batshuayi – Chelsea, Crystal Palace
Christian Benteke – Aston Villa, Liverpool, Crystal Palace
Dedryck Boyata – Bolton Wanderers
Timothy Castagne – Leicester City
Nacer Chadli – Tottenham Hotspur, West Bromwich Albion
Gilles De Bilde – Sheffield Wednesday
Kevin De Bruyne – Manchester City
Ritchie De Laet – Norwich City, Leicester City
Steven Defour – Burnley
Marc Degryse – Sheffield Wednesday
Mousa Dembélé – Fulham, Tottenham Hotspur
Leander Dendoncker – Wolverhampton Wanderers
Laurent Depoitre – Huddersfield Town
Björn Engels – Aston Villa
Marouane Fellaini – Everton, Manchester United
Eden Hazard – Chelsea
Adnan Januzaj – Manchester United
Christian Kabasele – Watford
Vincent Kompany – Manchester City
Roland Lamah – Swansea City
Roméo Lavia - Southampton
Romelu Lukaku – West Bromwich Albion, Everton, Manchester United, Chelsea (121)
Isaac Mbenza – Huddersfield Town
Kevin Mirallas – Everton
Émile Mpenza – Manchester City
Luc Nilis – Aston Villa
Amadou Onana – Everton
Divock Origi – Liverpool
Dennis Praet – Leicester City
Cédric Roussel – Coventry City
Branko Strupar – Derby County
Youri Tielemans – Leicester City
Leandro Trossard – Brighton & Hove Albion, Arsenal
Jelle Van Damme – Wolverhampton Wanderers
Thomas Vermaelen – Arsenal
Jan Vertonghen – Tottenham Hotspur

Benin
Rudy Gestede – Aston Villa, Middlesbrough
Steve Mounié – Huddersfield Town
Stéphane Sessègnon – Sunderland, West Bromwich Albion (25)

Bermuda
Shaun Goater – Manchester City (13)

Bosnia and Herzegovina
Asmir Begović – Stoke City
Edin Džeko – Manchester City (50)
Sead Kolašinac – Arsenal
Mario Vrančić – Norwich City

Brazil

Afonso Alves – Middlesbrough
Alex – Chelsea
Alisson Becker – Liverpool
Anderson – Manchester United
Antony – Manchester United
Fábio Aurélio – Liverpool
Júlio Baptista – Arsenal
Juliano Belletti – Chelsea
Bernard – Everton
Bruno Guimarães – Newcastle United
Caçapa – Newcastle United
Casemiro – Manchester United
Philippe Coutinho – Liverpool, Aston Villa
Danilo – Manchester City
David Luiz – Chelsea, Arsenal
Denílson – Arsenal
Douglas Luiz – Aston Villa
Edu – Arsenal
Elano – Manchester City
Emerson – Middlesbrough
Emerson Royal – Tottenham Hotspur
Fabinho – Liverpool
Fábio – Manchester United
Felipe Anderson – West Ham United
Fernandinho – Manchester City
Fernando – Manchester City
Roberto Firmino – Liverpool (79)
Fred – Manchester United
Gabriel Jesus – Manchester City, Arsenal
Gabriel Magalhães – Arsenal
Gabriel Martinelli – Arsenal
Gabriel Paulista – Arsenal
Geovanni – Manchester City, Hull City
Gilberto – Tottenham Hotspur
Gilberto Silva – Arsenal
Ilan – West Ham United
Isaías – Coventry City
Jô – Manchester City, Everton
João Gomes - Wolverhampton Wanderers
João Pedro – Watford
Joelinton – Newcastle United
Juninho – Middlesbrough
Kenedy – Chelsea, Newcastle United
Kléberson – Manchester United
Lucas Leiva – Liverpool
Lucas Moura – Tottenham Hotspur
Lucas Paquetá – West Ham United
Matheus Cunha – Wolverhampton Wanderers
Oscar – Chelsea
Alexandre Pato – Chelsea
Paulinho – Tottenham Hotspur
Andreas Pereira – Manchester United, Fulham
Matheus Pereira – West Bromwich Albion
Rafael – Manchester United
Ramires – Chelsea
Raphinha – Leeds United
Richarlison – Watford, Everton
Douglas Rinaldi – Watford
Robinho – Manchester City
Fábio Rochemback – Middlesbrough
Sandro – Tottenham Hotspur
André Santos – Arsenal 
Thiago Silva – Chelsea
Sylvinho – Arsenal
Tetê – Leicester City
Emerson Thome – Sheffield Wednesday, Sunderland
Carlos Vinícius – Tottenham Hotspur, Fulham
Wesley – Aston Villa
Willian – Chelsea, Arsenal, Fulham
Willian José – Wolverhampton Wanderers

Bulgaria
Dimitar Berbatov – Tottenham Hotspur, Manchester United, Fulham (94)
Valeri Bojinov – Manchester City
Boncho Genchev – Ipswich Town
Radostin Kishishev – Charlton Athletic
Martin Petrov – Manchester City, Bolton Wanderers
Stiliyan Petrov – Aston Villa
Svetoslav Todorov – West Ham United, Portsmouth

Burkina Faso
Bertrand Traoré – Chelsea, Aston Villa (9)

Burundi
Saido Berahino – West Bromwich Albion (23)
Gaël Bigirimana – Newcastle United

Cameroon
Benoît Assou-Ekotto – Tottenham Hotspur
Timothée Atouba – Tottenham Hotspur
Sébastien Bassong – Tottenham Hotspur, Norwich City
André Bikey – Reading, Burnley 
Eric Maxim Choupo-Moting – Stoke City
George Elokobi – Wolverhampton Wanderers
Samuel Eto'o – Chelsea, Everton
Marc-Vivien Foé – West Ham United, Manchester City
Geremi – Middlesbrough, Chelsea, Newcastle United
Joseph-Désiré Job – Middlesbrough (16)
Lauren – Arsenal
Joël Matip – Liverpool
Bryan Mbeumo – Brentford
Patrick M'Boma – Sunderland
Alex Song – Arsenal
Somen Tchoyi – West Bromwich Albion
Pierre Womé – Fulham

Canada
Scott Arfield – Burnley
David Edgar – Newcastle United
Junior Hoilett – Blackburn Rovers, Queens Park Rangers, Cardiff City
Simeon Jackson – Norwich City
Tomasz Radzinski – Everton, Fulham (35)
Paul Stalteri – Tottenham Hotspur
Frank Yallop – Ipswich Town

Chile
Clarence Acuña – Newcastle United
Jean Beausejour – Birmingham City, Wigan Athletic
Mark González – Liverpool
Ángelo Henríquez – Wigan Athletic
Gonzalo Jara – West Bromwich Albion
Luis Jiménez – West Ham United
Javier Margas – West Ham United
Alexis Sánchez – Arsenal, Manchester United (63)
Eduardo Vargas – Queens Park Rangers

China PR
Sun Jihai – Manchester City (3)
Zheng Zhi – Charlton Athletic

Colombia
Steven Alzate – Brighton & Hove Albion
Juan Pablo Ángel – Aston Villa (44)
Faustino Asprilla – Newcastle United
Luis Díaz – Liverpool
Radamel Falcao – Manchester United, Chelsea
Cucho Hernández – Watford
José Izquierdo – Brighton & Hove Albion
Jefferson Lerma – Bournemouth
Yerry Mina – Everton
Hámilton Ricard – Middlesbrough
Hugo Rodallega – Wigan Athletic, Fulham
James Rodríguez – Everton
Davinson Sánchez – Tottenham Hotspur
Luis Sinisterra – Leeds United
Jhon Viáfara – Portsmouth
Juan Camilo Zúñiga – Watford

Congo
Christopher Samba – Blackburn Rovers (16)
Thievy – West Bromwich Albion

Costa Rica
Joel Campbell – Arsenal
Bryan Oviedo – Everton
Bryan Ruiz – Fulham
Paulo Wanchope – Derby County, West Ham United, Manchester City (50)

Croatia

Aljoša Asanović – Derby County
Slaven Bilić – West Ham United
Igor Bišćan – Liverpool
Alen Bokšić – Middlesbrough
Vedran Ćorluka – Manchester City, Tottenham Hotspur
Eduardo – Arsenal
Nikica Jelavić – Everton, Hull City, West Ham United (29)
Nikola Kalinić – Blackburn Rovers
Ivan Klasnić – Bolton Wanderers
Mateo Kovačić – Chelsea
Andrej Kramarić – Leicester City
Niko Kranjčar – Portsmouth, Tottenham Hotspur
Dejan Lovren – Southampton, Liverpool
Luka Modrić – Tottenham Hotspur
Ivica Mornar – Portsmouth
Ivan Perišić – Tottenham Hotspur
Mladen Petrić – Fulham
Mario Stanić – Chelsea
Igor Štimac – Derby County, West Ham United
Davor Šuker – Arsenal, West Ham United
Nikola Vlašić – West Ham United

Cuba
Onel Hernández – Norwich City (1)

Curaçao
Vurnon Anita – Newcastle United
Juninho Bacuna - Huddersfield Town
Leandro Bacuna – Aston Villa (6)
Cuco Martina – Southampton

Czech Republic
Milan Baroš – Liverpool, Aston Villa
Roman Bednář – West Bromwich Albion
Patrik Berger – Liverpool, Portsmouth, Aston Villa (38)
Jiří Jarošík – Birmingham City
Libor Kozák – Aston Villa
Marek Matějovský – Reading
Karel Poborský – Manchester United
Tomáš Rosický – Arsenal
Vladimír Šmicer – Liverpool
Tomáš Souček – West Ham United
Matěj Vydra – West Bromwich Albion, Burnley
Radoslav Kováč - West Ham United

Denmark

Daniel Agger – Liverpool
Martin Albrechtsen – West Bromwich Albion
Joachim Andersen – Fulham, Crystal Palace
Mikkel Beck – Middlesbrough, Derby County
Nicklas Bendtner – Arsenal, Sunderland
Philip Billing – Huddersfield Town, Bournemouth
Ronnie Ekelund – Southampton
Christian Eriksen – Tottenham Hotspur, Brentford, Manchester United (53)
Per Frandsen – Bolton Wanderers
Thomas Gaardsøe – Ipswich Town
Bjarne Goldbæk – Chelsea, Fulham
Thomas Gravesen – Everton
Jesper Grønkjær – Chelsea
Bo Hansen – Bolton Wanderers
Pierre-Emile Højbjerg – Southampton, Tottenham Hotspur
Claus Jensen – Charlton Athletic, Fulham
John Jensen – Arsenal
Mathias Jensen – Brentford
Niclas Jensen – Manchester City
Michael Johansen – Bolton Wanderers
Mathias Jørgensen – Huddersfield Town, Brentford
Jakob Kjeldbjerg – Chelsea
Rasmus Kristensen – Leeds United
Jacob Laursen – Derby County
Martin Laursen – Aston Villa
Jores Okore – Aston Villa
Peter Løvenkrands – Newcastle United
Jan Mølby – Liverpool
Allan Nielsen – Tottenham Hotspur
Christian Nørgaard – Brentford
Henrik Pedersen – Bolton Wanderers
Per Pedersen – Blackburn Rovers
Marc Rieper – West Ham United
Mads Roerslev – Brentford
Dennis Rommedahl – Charlton Athletic
Peter Schmeichel – Aston Villa
Claus Thomsen – Ipswich Town, Everton
Jon Dahl Tomasson – Newcastle United
Jannik Vestergaard – Southampton
Kenneth Zohore – Cardiff City

DR Congo
Benik Afobe – Bournemouth
Yannick Bolasie – Crystal Palace, Everton
Giannelli Imbula – Stoke City
Elias Kachunga – Huddersfield Town
Gaël Kakuta – Fulham
Lomana LuaLua – Newcastle United, Portsmouth (24)
Arthur Masuaku – West Ham United
Dieumerci Mbokani – Norwich City
Youssouf Mulumbu – West Bromwich Albion
Michel Ngonge – Watford
Shabani Nonda – Blackburn Rovers
Yoane Wissa – Brentford

Ecuador
Christian Benítez – Birmingham City
Felipe Caicedo – Manchester City
Moisés Caicedo – Brighton & Hove Albion
Ulises de la Cruz – Aston Villa, Reading
Agustín Delgado – Southampton
Antonio Valencia – Wigan Athletic, Manchester United (24)
Enner Valencia – West Ham United, Everton

Egypt

Ahmed Elmohamady – Sunderland, Hull City, Aston Villa
Mohamed Elneny – Arsenal
Hossam Ghaly – Tottenham Hotspur
Ahmed Hegazi – West Bromwich Albion
Mido – Tottenham Hotspur, Middlesbrough, Wigan Athletic
Mohamed Salah – Chelsea, Liverpool (131)
Ramadan Sobhi – Stoke City
Trézéguet – Aston Villa
Amr Zaki – Wigan Athletic

Equatorial Guinea
Pedro Obiang – West Ham United (3)

Estonia
Ragnar Klavan – Liverpool (1)

Finland
Mikael Forssell – Chelsea, Birmingham City (34)
Sami Hyypiä – Liverpool
Jonatan Johansson – Charlton Athletic
Joonas Kolkka – Crystal Palace
Shefki Kuqi – Blackburn Rovers
Jari Litmanen – Liverpool
Mixu Paatelainen – Bolton Wanderers
Teemu Pukki – Norwich City
Aki Riihilahti – Crystal Palace
Teemu Tainio – Tottenham Hotspur

France

Samassi Abou – West Ham United
Rayan Aït-Nouri – Wolverhampton Wanderers
Morgan Amalfitano – West Bromwich Albion, West Ham United
Jérémie Aliadière – Arsenal, Middlesbrough
Nicolas Anelka – Arsenal, Liverpool, Manchester City, Bolton Wanderers, Chelsea, West Bromwich Albion
Tiémoué Bakayoko – Chelsea
David Bellion – Sunderland, Manchester United
Hatem Ben Arfa – Newcastle United
Olivier Bernard – Newcastle United
Laurent Blanc – Manchester United
Thierry Bonalair – Nottingham Forest
Yohan Cabaye – Newcastle United, Crystal Palace
Rémy Cabella – Newcastle United
Zoumana Camara – Leeds United
Eric Cantona – Leeds United, Manchester United
Étienne Capoue – Tottenham Hotspur, Watford
Patrice Carteron – Sunderland
Laurent Charvet – Chelsea, Newcastle United, Manchester City
Bruno Cheyrou – Liverpool
Pascal Chimbonda – Wigan Athletic, Tottenham Hotspur, Blackburn Rovers
Philippe Christanval – Fulham
Djibril Cissé – Liverpool, Sunderland, Queens Park Rangers
Édouard Cissé – West Ham United
Gaël Clichy – Arsenal, Manchester City
Patrick Colleter – Southampton
Pascal Cygan – Arsenal
Olivier Dacourt – Everton, Leeds United
Stéphane Dalmat – Tottenham Hotspur
Jean-Claude Darcheville – Nottingham Forest
Mathieu Debuchy – Newcastle United, Arsenal
Marcel Desailly – Chelsea
Abou Diaby – Arsenal
Lassana Diarra – Portsmouth
Lucas Digne – Everton, Aston Villa
Issa Diop – West Ham United, Fulham
Sylvain Distin – Everton, Manchester City, Newcastle United
Martin Djetou – Fulham
Youri Djorkaeff – Bolton Wanderers
Didier Domi – Newcastle United
Christophe Dugarry – Birmingham City
Patrice Evra – Manchester United
Odsonne Édouard – Crystal Palace
Julien Faubert – West Ham United
Fabrice Fernandes – Southampton
Mathieu Flamini – Arsenal
Wesley Fofana – Chelsea
Marc-Antoine Fortuné – West Bromwich Albion
William Gallas – Chelsea, Arsenal, Tottenham Hotspur
David Ginola – Newcastle United, Tottenham Hotspur, Aston Villa
Olivier Giroud – Arsenal, Chelsea
Gaël Givet – Blackburn Rovers
Alain Goma – Newcastle United
Bafétimbi Gomis – Swansea City
Yoan Gouffran – Newcastle United
Elliot Grandin – Blackpool
Xavier Gravelaine – Watford
Léandre Griffit – Southampton
Gilles Grimandi – Arsenal
Stéphane Guivarc'h – Newcastle United
Thierry Henry – Arsenal (175)
Younès Kaboul – Tottenham Hotspur, Portsmouth, Watford
N'Golo Kanté – Leicester City, Chelsea
Olivier Kapo – Birmingham City, Wigan Athletic
Christian Karembeu – Middlesbrough
Anthony Knockaert – Brighton & Hove Albion
Laurent Koscielny – Arsenal
Alexandre Lacazette – Arsenal
Bernard Lambourde – Chelsea
Anthony Le Tallec – Sunderland
Frank Leboeuf – Chelsea
Pierre Lees-Melou – Norwich City
Sylvain Legwinski – Fulham
Florian Lejeune – Newcastle United
Mickaël Madar – Everton
Claude Makélélé – Chelsea
Steed Malbranque – Fulham, Tottenham Hotspur, Sunderland
Florent Malouda – Chelsea
Steve Marlet – Fulham
Anthony Martial – Manchester United
Sylvain Marveaux – Newcastle United
Jean-Philippe Mateta – Crystal Palace
Neal Maupay – Brighton & Hove Albion, Everton
Youl Mawéné – Derby County
Benjamin Mendy – Manchester City
Bernard Mendy – Hull City
Lys Mousset – Bournemouth, Sheffield United
Steven Mouyokolo – Hull City
Yann M'Vila – Sunderland
Christian Nadé – Sheffield United
Lilian Nalis – Leicester City
Samir Nasri – Arsenal, Manchester City
Tanguy Ndombele – Tottenham Hotspur
David N'Gog – Liverpool, Bolton Wanderers
Bruno Ngotty – Bolton Wanderers
Charles N'Zogbia – Newcastle United, Wigan Athletic, Aston Villa
Steven Nzonzi – Blackburn Rovers, Stoke City
Gabriel Obertan – Newcastle United
Michael Olise – Crystal Palace
Noé Pamarot – Tottenham Hotspur, Portsmouth
Dimitri Payet – West Ham United
Sébastien Pérez – Blackburn Rovers
Romain Perraud – Southampton
Emmanuel Petit – Arsenal, Chelsea
Frédéric Piquionne – Portsmouth, West Ham United
Robert Pires – Arsenal
Paul Pogba – Manchester United
Sébastien Puygrenier – Bolton Wanderers
Franck Queudrue – Middlesbrough, Fulham
Loïc Rémy – Queens Park Rangers, Newcastle United, Chelsea
Laurent Robert – Newcastle United, Portsmouth
Bacary Sagna – Arsenal
Louis Saha – Newcastle United, Fulham, Manchester United, Everton, Tottenham Hotspur
Allan Saint-Maximin – Newcastle United
Mamadou Sakho – Liverpool, Crystal Palace
William Saliba – Arsenal
Sébastien Schemmel – West Ham United
Morgan Schneiderlin – Southampton, Manchester United, Everton
Antoine Sibierski – Manchester City, Newcastle United, Wigan Athletic
Mikaël Silvestre – Manchester United, Arsenal
Florent Sinama Pongolle – Liverpool, Blackburn Rovers
Moussa Sissoko – Newcastle United, Tottenham Hotspur, Watford
David Sommeil – Manchester City
Sébastien Squillaci – Arsenal
Raphaël Varane – Manchester United
Patrick Vieira – Arsenal, Manchester City
Sylvain Wiltord – Arsenal
Kurt Zouma – Chelsea, Stoke City, Everton, West Ham United
Ronald Zubar – Wolverhampton Wanderers

Gabon
Pierre-Emerick Aubameyang – Arsenal, Chelsea (69)
Daniel Cousin – Hull City
Mario Lemina – Southampton, Fulham
Didier Ndong – Sunderland

Gambia
Modou Barrow – Swansea City (1)

Georgia
Mikhail Kavelashvili – Manchester City
Temur Ketsbaia – Newcastle United (8)
Zurab Khizanishvili – Blackburn Rovers
Georgi Kinkladze – Manchester City, Derby County

Germany

Markus Babbel – Liverpool, Blackburn Rovers
Michael Ballack – Chelsea
Stefan Beinlich – Aston Villa
Fredi Bobic – Bolton Wanderers
Emre Can – Liverpool
Maurizio Gaudino – Manchester City
Serge Gnabry – Arsenal
Pascal Groß – Brighton & Hove Albion
İlkay Gündoğan – Manchester City (39)
Dietmar Hamann – Newcastle United, Liverpool, Manchester City
Kai Havertz – Chelsea
Thomas Hitzlsperger – Aston Villa, West Ham United, Everton
Lewis Holtby – Tottenham Hotspur, Fulham
Robert Huth – Middlesbrough, Stoke City, Leicester City
Vitaly Janelt – Brentford
Steffen Karl – Manchester City
Jürgen Klinsmann – Tottenham Hotspur
Stefan Malz – Arsenal
Marko Marin – Chelsea
Per Mertesacker – Arsenal
Max Meyer – Crystal Palace
Shkodran Mustafi – Arsenal
Mesut Özil – Arsenal
Lukas Podolski – Arsenal
Karl-Heinz Riedle – Liverpool
Uwe Rösler – Manchester City
Antonio Rüdiger – Chelsea
Leroy Sané – Manchester City
Christopher Schindler – Huddersfield Town
Stefan Schnoor – Derby County
André Schürrle – Chelsea, Fulham
Bastian Schweinsteiger – Manchester United
Dennis Srbeny – Norwich City
Michael Tarnat – Manchester City
Moritz Volz – Fulham
Timo Werner – Chelsea
Christian Ziege – Middlesbrough, Liverpool, Tottenham Hotspur

Ghana
Daniel Amartey – Leicester City
Christian Atsu – Newcastle United
André Ayew – Swansea City, West Ham United
Jordan Ayew – Aston Villa, Swansea City, Crystal Palace (30)
Kevin-Prince Boateng – Portsmouth
Michael Essien – Chelsea
Asamoah Gyan – Sunderland
Tariq Lamptey – Brighton & Hove Albion
John Mensah – Sunderland
Sulley Muntari – Portsmouth
Alex Nyarko – Everton
Thomas Partey – Arsenal
Jeffrey Schlupp – Leicester City, Crystal Palace
Tony Yeboah – Leeds United

Gibraltar
Danny Higginbotham – Derby County, Southampton, Sunderland, Stoke City (9)

Greece
George Baldock – Sheffield United
Nikos Dabizas – Newcastle United
Giorgos Donis – Blackburn Rovers
Stelios Giannakopoulos – Bolton Wanderers (20)
José Holebas – Watford
Giorgos Karagounis – Fulham
Sotirios Kyrgiakos – Liverpool
Sokratis Papastathopoulos – Arsenal
Georgios Samaras – Manchester City
Apostolos Vellios – Everton
Theodoros Zagorakis – Leicester City

Grenada
Shandon Baptiste – Brentford
Delroy Facey – Bolton Wanderers
Jason Roberts – West Bromwich Albion, Portsmouth, Wigan Athletic, Blackburn Rovers (36)

Guinea
Titi Camara – Liverpool (9)
Naby Keïta – Liverpool
Kamil Zayatte – Hull City

Guyana
Carl Cort – Wimbledon, Newcastle United, Wolverhampton Wanderers (28)

Honduras
Roger Espinoza – Wigan Athletic
Maynor Figueroa – Wigan Athletic (4)
Wilson Palacios – Tottenham Hotspur

Hungary
Ákos Buzsáky – Queens Park Rangers
Zoltán Gera – West Bromwich Albion, Fulham (17)
Tamás Priskin – Watford

Iceland
Guðni Bergsson – Tottenham Hotspur, Bolton Wanderers
Eiður Guðjohnsen – Chelsea, Tottenham Hotspur
Joey Guðjónsson – Aston Villa
Þórður Guðjónsson – Derby County
Jóhann Berg Guðmundsson  – Burnley
Aron Gunnarsson – Cardiff City
Brynjar Gunnarsson – Reading
Arnar Gunnlaugsson – Leicester City
Heiðar Helguson – Watford, Fulham, Bolton Wanderers, Queens Park Rangers
Hermann Hreiðarsson – Crystal Palace, Wimbledon, Ipswich Town, Charlton Athletic, Portsmouth
Ívar Ingimarsson – Reading
Þorvaldur Örlygsson – Nottingham Forest
Gylfi Sigurðsson – Swansea City, Tottenham Hotspur, Everton (67)
Grétar Steinsson – Bolton Wanderers

Iran
Ashkan Dejagah – Fulham (5)
Saman Ghoddos – Brentford
Alireza Jahanbakhsh – Brighton & Hove Albion
Andranik Teymourian – Bolton Wanderers

Israel
Walid Badir – Wimbledon
Yossi Benayoun – West Ham United, Liverpool, Chelsea, Arsenal (31)
Tal Ben Haim – Bolton Wanderers
Eyal Berkovic – Southampton, West Ham United, Manchester City, Portsmouth
Tamir Cohen – Bolton Wanderers
Tomer Hemed – Brighton & Hove Albion
Beram Kayal – Brighton & Hove Albion
Avi Nimni – Derby County
Ronny Rosenthal – Liverpool, Tottenham Hotspur
Itay Shechter – Swansea City
Manor Solomon – Fulham
Idan Tal – Everton

Italy

Lorenzo Amoruso – Blackburn Rovers
Alberto Aquilani – Liverpool
Dino Baggio – Blackburn Rovers
Francesco Baiano – Derby County
Mario Balotelli – Manchester City, Liverpool
Nicola Berti – Tottenham Hotspur
Rolando Bianchi – Manchester City
Fabio Borini – Liverpool, Sunderland
Benito Carbone – Sheffield Wednesday, Aston Villa, Bradford City, Derby County, Middlesbrough 
Pierluigi Casiraghi – Chelsea
Bernardo Corradi – Manchester City
Patrick Cutrone – Wolverhampton Wanderers
Samuele Dalla Bona – Chelsea
Matteo Darmian – Manchester United
Paolo Di Canio – Sheffield Wednesday, West Ham United, Charlton Athletic (66)
Roberto Di Matteo – Chelsea
David Di Michele – West Ham United
Alessandro Diamanti – West Ham United
Andrea Dossena – Liverpool
Emerson – West Ham United
Stefano Eranio – Derby County
Gianluca Festa – Middlesbrough
Manolo Gabbiadini – Southampton
Emanuele Giaccherini – Sunderland
Wilfried Gnonto – Leeds United
Corrado Grabbi – Blackburn Rovers
Jorginho – Chelsea
Moise Kean – Everton
Attilio Lombardo – Crystal Palace
Massimo Maccarone – Middlesbrough
Federico Macheda – Manchester United
Dario Marcolin – Blackburn Rovers
Marco Materazzi – Everton
Vincenzo Montella – Fulham
Angelo Ogbonna – West Ham United
Stefano Okaka – Fulham, Watford
Dani Osvaldo – Southampton
Alberto Paloschi – Swansea City
Graziano Pellè – Southampton
Alessandro Pistone – Newcastle United, Everton
Andrea Ranocchia – Hull City
Fabrizio Ravanelli – Middlesbrough, Derby County
Giuseppe Rossi – Manchester United
Francesco Sanetti – Sheffield Wednesday
Davide Santon – Newcastle United
Gianluca Scamacca – West Ham United
Nicola Ventola – Crystal Palace
Gianluca Vialli – Chelsea
Davide Zappacosta – Chelsea
Gianfranco Zola – Chelsea

Ivory Coast

Serge Aurier – Tottenham Hotspur, Nottingham Forest
Eric Bailly – Manchester United
Ibrahima Bakayoko – Everton
Sol Bamba – Cardiff City
Willy Boly – Wolverhampton Wanderers
Wilfried Bony – Swansea City, Manchester City, Stoke City
Maxwel Cornet – Burnley
Guy Demel – West Ham United
Aruna Dindane – Portsmouth
Didier Drogba – Chelsea (104)
Emmanuel Eboué – Arsenal
Gervinho – Arsenal
Steve Gohouri – Wigan Athletic
Max Gradel – Bournemouth
Sébastien Haller – West Ham United
Salomon Kalou – Chelsea
Hassane Kamara – Watford
Arouna Koné – Wigan Athletic, Everton
Lamine Koné – Sunderland 
Nicolas Pépé – Arsenal
Yannick Sagbo – Hull City
Jean Michaël Seri – Fulham
Cheick Tioté – Newcastle United
Kolo Touré – Arsenal, Manchester City, Liverpool
Yaya Touré – Manchester City
Wilfried Zaha – Crystal Palace

Jamaica
Michail Antonio – West Ham United (59)
Leon Bailey – Aston Villa
Giles Barnes – Derby County
Jermaine Beckford – Everton
Trevor Benjamin – Leicester City
Deon Burton – Derby County
Bobby Decordova-Reid – Cardiff City, Fulham
Robbie Earle – Wimbledon
Jason Euell – Wimbledon, Charlton Athletic
Ricardo Fuller – Portsmouth, Stoke City
Ricardo Gardner – Bolton Wanderers
Marcus Gayle – Wimbledon
Andre Gray – Burnley, Watford
Barry Hayles – Fulham
Micah Hyde – Watford
Marlon King – Watford, Wigan Athletic, Hull City, Middlesbrough
Jamie Lawrence – Leicester City, Bradford City
Kevin Lisbie – Charlton Athletic
Adrian Mariappa – Reading, Crystal Palace
Darren Moore – West Bromwich Albion
Wes Morgan – Leicester City
Ravel Morrison – West Ham United
Ethan Pinnock – Brentford
Darryl Powell – Derby County
Marvin Robinson – Derby County
Fitzroy Simpson – Manchester City
Frank Sinclair – Chelsea, Leicester City

Japan
Junichi Inamoto – Fulham
Shinji Kagawa – Manchester United
Takumi Minamino – Liverpool, Southampton
Kaoru Mitoma – Brighton & Hove Albion
Yoshinori Muto – Newcastle United
Hidetoshi Nakata – Bolton Wanderers
Shinji Okazaki – Leicester City (14)
Maya Yoshida – Southampton

Kenya
Victor Wanyama – Southampton, Tottenham Hotspur (10)

Korea Republic

Hwang Hee-chan – Wolverhampton Wanderers
Ji Dong-won – Sunderland
Ki Sung-yueng – Swansea City, Sunderland
Kim Bo-kyung – Cardiff City
Lee Chung-yong – Bolton Wanderers, Crystal Palace
Park Ji-sung – Manchester United 
Seol Ki-hyeon – Reading, Fulham
Son Heung-min – Tottenham Hotspur (99)

Kosovo
Milot Rashica – Norwich City (1)

Latvia
Kaspars Gorkšs – Reading
Marians Pahars – Southampton (42)

Liberia
George Weah – Chelsea, Manchester City (4)
Christopher Wreh – Arsenal

Mali
Yves Bissouma – Brighton & Hove Albion
Kalifa Cissé – Reading
Samba Diakité – Queens Park Rangers
Mahamadou Diarra – Fulham
Moussa Djenepo – Southampton
Abdoulaye Doucouré – Watford, Everton
Frédéric Kanouté – West Ham United, Tottenham Hotspur (43)
Jimmy Kébé – Reading
Modibo Maïga – West Ham United
Bakary Sako – Crystal Palace
Mamady Sidibé – Stoke City
Mohamed Sissoko – Liverpool
Molla Wagué – Watford

Mauritania
Aboubakar Kamara – Fulham (3)

Mexico
Jared Borgetti – Bolton Wanderers
Guillermo Franco – West Ham United
Javier Hernández – Manchester United, West Ham United (53)
Raúl Jiménez – Wolverhampton Wanderers
Miguel Layún – Watford
Carlos Vela – Arsenal, West Bromwich Albion

Montenegro
Stevan Jovetić – Manchester City (8)
Stefan Savić – Manchester City
Simon Vukčević – Blackburn Rovers

Montserrat
Bruce Dyer – Crystal Palace
Ruel Fox – Norwich City, Newcastle United, Tottenham Hotspur (36)

Morocco
Oussama Assaidi – Stoke City
Sofiane Boufal – Southampton
Marouane Chamakh – Arsenal, Crystal Palace
Youssef Chippo – Coventry City
Manuel da Costa – West Ham United
Karim El Ahmadi – Aston Villa
Talal El Karkouri – Charlton Athletic
Tahar El Khalej – Southampton
Mustapha Hadji – Coventry City, Aston Villa
Hassan Kachloul – Southampton, Aston Villa (16)
Adam Masina – Watford
Noureddine Naybet – Tottenham Hotspur
Youssef Safri – Norwich City
Romain Saïss – Wolverhampton Wanderers
Adel Taarabt – Queens Park Rangers
Hakim Ziyech – Chelsea

Netherlands

Patrick van Aanholt – Sunderland, Crystal Palace
Ibrahim Afellay – Stoke City
Nathan Aké – Watford, Bournemouth, Manchester City
Ryan Babel – Liverpool, Fulham
Donny van de Beek – Manchester United, Everton
Dennis Bergkamp – Arsenal
Steven Bergwijn – Tottenham Hotspur
Daley Blind – Manchester United
Regi Blinker – Sheffield Wednesday
George Boateng – Coventry City, Aston Villa, Middlesbrough, Hull City
Jeroen Boere – West Ham United
Paul Bosvelt – Manchester City
Wilfred Bouma – Aston Villa
Giovanni van Bronckhorst – Arsenal
Alexander Büttner – Manchester United
Jordy Clasie – Southampton
Jordi Cruyff – Manchester United
Chris David – Fulham
Edgar Davids – Tottenham Hotspur
Memphis Depay – Manchester United
Virgil van Dijk – Southampton, Liverpool
Royston Drenthe – Everton
Anwar El Ghazi – Aston Villa
Eljero Elia – Southampton
Marvin Emnes – Swansea City
Leroy Fer – Norwich City, Queens Park Rangers, Swansea City
Fabian de Freitas – Bolton Wanderers
Cody Gakpo – Liverpool
Ulrich van Gobbel – Southampton
Ruud Gullit – Chelsea
Jonathan de Guzmán – Swansea City
Jimmy Floyd Hasselbaink – Leeds United, Chelsea, Middlesbrough, Charlton Athletic
John Heitinga – Everton, Fulham
Glenn Helder – Arsenal
Pierre van Hooijdonk – Nottingham Forest
Mike van der Hoorn – Swansea City
Daryl Janmaat – Newcastle United, Watford
Vincent Janssen – Tottenham Hotspur
Collins John – Fulham
Luuk de Jong – Newcastle United
Nigel de Jong – Manchester City
Siem de Jong – Newcastle United
Wim Jonk – Sheffield Wednesday
Patrick Kluivert – Newcastle United
Terence Kongolo – Huddersfield Town
Willem Korsten – Leeds United, Tottenham Hotspur
Dirk Kuyt – Liverpool
Robin van der Laan – Derby County
Denny Landzaat – Wigan Athletic
Rajiv van La Parra – Huddersfield Town
Jeremain Lens – Sunderland
Jürgen Locadia – Brighton & Hove Albion
Bruno Martins Indi – Stoke City
Mario Melchiot – Chelsea, Birmingham City
Robert Molenaar – Leeds United, Bradford City
Ken Monkou – Southampton
Kiki Musampa – Manchester City
Luciano Narsingh – Swansea City
Luc Nijholt – Swindon Town
Ruud van Nistelrooy – Manchester United
André Ooijer – Blackburn Rovers
Marc Overmars – Arsenal
Robin van Persie – Arsenal, Manchester United (144)
Erik Pieters – Stoke City
Davy Pröpper – Brighton & Hove Albion
Michael Reiziger – Middlesbrough
Martijn Reuser – Ipswich Town
Jaïro Riedewald – Crystal Palace
Arjen Robben – Chelsea
Marten de Roon – Middlesbrough
Bryan Roy – Nottingham Forest
Gerald Sibon – Sheffield Wednesday
Richard Sneekes – Bolton Wanderers
Jaap Stam – Manchester United
Ronnie Stam – Wigan Athletic
Pascal Struijk – Leeds United
Crysencio Summerville – Leeds United
Dwight Tiendalli – Swansea City
Orlando Trustfull – Sheffield Wednesday
Rafael van der Vaart – Tottenham Hotspur
Joël Veltman – Brighton & Hove Albion
Jan Vennegoor of Hesselink – Hull City
Ron Vlaar – Aston Villa
Michel Vonk – Manchester City
Wout Weghorst – Burnley
Gerard Wiekens – Manchester City
Georginio Wijnaldum – Newcastle United, Liverpool
Clyde Wijnhard – Leeds United
Jetro Willems – Newcastle United
Ron Willems – Derby County
Fabian Wilnis – Ipswich Town
Ricky van Wolfswinkel – Norwich City
Nordin Wooter – Watford
Arjan de Zeeuw – Portsmouth
Boudewijn Zenden – Chelsea, Middlesbrough, Liverpool, Sunderland

New Zealand
Ryan Nelsen – Blackburn Rovers, Queens Park Rangers 
Winston Reid – West Ham United
Chris Wood – Leicester City, Burnley, Newcastle United, Nottingham Forest (55)

Nigeria
Ola Aina – Fulham
Semi Ajayi – West Bromwich Albion
Ade Akinbiyi – Leicester City
Sammy Ameobi – Newcastle United
Shola Ameobi – Newcastle United
Daniel Amokachi – Everton
Victor Anichebe – Everton, West Bromwich Albion, Sunderland
Sone Aluko – Hull City
Joe Aribo – Southampton
Taiwo Awoniyi – Nottingham Forest
Celestine Babayaro – Chelsea, Newcastle United
Leon Balogun – Brighton & Hove Albion
Emmanuel Dennis – Watford, Nottingham Forest
Efan Ekoku – Norwich City, Wimbledon
Dickson Etuhu – Sunderland, Fulham
Kelvin Etuhu - Manchester City
Finidi George – Ipswich Town
Brown Ideye – West Bromwich Albion
Kelechi Iheanacho – Manchester City, Leicester City
Odion Ighalo – Watford
Alex Iwobi – Arsenal, Everton
Nwankwo Kanu – Arsenal, West Bromwich Albion, Portsmouth
Ademola Lookman – Everton, Fulham, Leicester City
Josh Maja – Fulham
Obafemi Martins – Newcastle United
John Obi Mikel – Chelsea
Victor Moses – Wigan Athletic, Chelsea, Liverpool, Stoke City, West Ham United
Ahmed Musa – Leicester City
Wilfred Ndidi – Leicester City
Victor Obinna – West Ham United
Peter Odemwingie – West Bromwich Albion, Cardiff City, Stoke City
Jay-Jay Okocha – Bolton Wanderers
Seyi Olofinjana – Stoke City, Hull City
Danny Shittu – Watford
Isaac Success – Watford
Taye Taiwo – Queens Park Rangers
John Utaka – Portsmouth
Yakubu – Portsmouth, Middlesbrough, Everton, Blackburn Rovers (95)
Joseph Yobo – Everton

North Macedonia
Ezgjan Alioski – Leeds United
Gjorgji Hristov – Barnsley (4)

Norway
Kristoffer Ajer – Brentford
Martin Andresen – Wimbledon
Eirik Bakke – Leeds United
Henning Berg – Blackburn Rovers, Manchester United
Sander Berge – Sheffield United
Stig Inge Bjørnebye – Liverpool, Blackburn Rovers
Lars Bohinen – Nottingham Forest, Blackburn Rovers, Derby County
Daniel Braaten – Bolton Wanderers
John Carew – Aston Villa, Stoke City
Mats Møller Dæhli – Cardiff City
Adama Diomande – Hull City
Mohamed Elyounoussi – Southampton
Jan Åge Fjørtoft – Swindon Town, Middlesbrough, Barnsley
Jostein Flo – Sheffield United
Tore André Flo – Chelsea, Sunderland
Alfie Haaland – Nottingham Forest, Leeds United, Manchester City
Erling Haaland - Manchester City
Gunnar Halle – Oldham Athletic, Leeds United
Brede Hangeland – Fulham, Crystal Palace
Vegard Heggem – Liverpool
Jon Olav Hjelde – Nottingham Forest
Steffen Iversen – Tottenham Hotspur, Wolverhampton Wanderers
Erland Johnsen – Chelsea
Ronny Johnsen – Manchester United, Aston Villa
Azar Karadas – Portsmouth
Joshua King – Bournemouth, Watford
Øyvind Leonhardsen – Wimbledon, Liverpool, Tottenham Hotspur, Aston Villa
Andreas Lund – Wimbledon
Claus Lundekvam – Southampton
Erik Nevland – Fulham
Mathias Normann – Norwich City
Martin Ødegaard – Arsenal
Egil Østenstad – Southampton, Blackburn Rovers
Morten Gamst Pedersen – Blackburn Rovers
John Arne Riise – Liverpool, Fulham
Petter Rudi – Sheffield Wednesday
Ståle Solbakken – Wimbledon
Ole Gunnar Solskjær – Manchester United (91)
Trond Egil Soltvedt – Coventry City, Southampton
Frank Strandli – Leeds United
Jo Tessem – Southampton
Alexander Tettey – Norwich City

Paraguay
Antolín Alcaraz – Wigan Athletic
Miguel Almirón – Newcastle United
Fabián Balbuena – West Ham United
Diego Gavilán – Newcastle United
Cristian Riveros – Sunderland
Roque Santa Cruz – Blackburn Rovers, Manchester City (26)

Peru
André Carrillo – Watford
Claudio Pizarro – Chelsea
Nolberto Solano – Newcastle United, Aston Villa, West Ham United (49)
Ysrael Zúñiga – Coventry City

Poland
Jan Bednarek – Southampton (7)
Matty Cash - Aston Villa
Mateusz Klich – Leeds United
Robert Warzycha – Everton
Marcin Wasilewski – Leicester City

Portugal

Luís Boa Morte – Southampton, Fulham, West Ham United
José Bosingwa – Chelsea
João Cancelo – Manchester City
Fábio Carvalho – Liverpool
Ricardo Carvalho – Chelsea
Ivan Cavaleiro – Wolverhampton Wanderers, Fulham
Cédric – Southampton, Arsenal
Dani – West Ham United
Deco – Chelsea
Rúben Dias – Manchester City
José Dominguez – Tottenham Hotspur
João Félix – Chelsea
Bruno Fernandes – Manchester United
Manuel Fernandes – Everton
José Fonte – Southampton
André Gomes – Everton
Gonçalo Guedes – Wolverhampton Wanderers
Hélder – Newcastle United
João Mário – West Ham United
Diogo Jota – Wolverhampton Wanderers, Liverpool
Raul Meireles – Liverpool, Chelsea
Pedro Mendes – Tottenham Hotspur, Portsmouth
João Moutinho – Wolverhampton Wanderers
Nani – Manchester United
Pedro Neto – Wolverhampton Wanderers
Rúben Neves – Wolverhampton Wanderers
Nélson Oliveira – Swansea City
João Palhinha – Fulham
Ricardo Pereira – Leicester City
Daniel Podence – Wolverhampton Wanderers
Hugo Porfírio – West Ham United, Nottingham Forest
Hélder Postiga – Tottenham Hotspur
Domingos Quina – Watford
Bruno Ribeiro – Leeds United
Cristiano Ronaldo – Manchester United (103)
Orlando Sá – Fulham
Nélson Semedo – Wolverhampton Wanderers
Bernardo Silva – Manchester City
Fábio Silva – Wolverhampton Wanderers
Nuno Tavares – Arsenal
Tiago – Chelsea
Francisco Trincão – Wolverhampton Wanderers
Silvestre Varela – West Bromwich Albion
Ricardo Vaz Tê – Bolton Wanderers, West Ham United
Hugo Viana – Newcastle United
Fábio Vieira – Arsenal
Abel Xavier – Liverpool, Middlesbrough

Republic of Ireland

Keith Andrews – Blackburn Rovers, West Bromwich Albion
Harry Arter – Bournemouth
Phil Babb – Liverpool
Leon Best – Newcastle United
Robbie Brady – Hull City, Norwich City, Burnley
Gary Breen – Coventry City, Sunderland
Paul Butler – Sunderland, Wolverhampton Wanderers
Stephen Carr – Tottenham Hotspur, Newcastle United
Lee Carsley – Derby County, Coventry City, Everton
Tony Cascarino – Chelsea
Ciaran Clark – Aston Villa, Newcastle United
Séamus Coleman – Everton
Nathan Collins – Burnley
Aaron Connolly – Brighton & Hove Albion
David Connolly – Wigan Athletic
Simon Cox – West Bromwich Albion
Liam Daish – Coventry City
Damien Delaney – Crystal Palace
Rory Delap – Derby County, Southampton, Sunderland, Stoke City
Gary Doherty – Tottenham Hotspur, Norwich City
Matt Doherty – Wolverhampton Wanderers, Tottenham Hotspur
Jonathan Douglas – Blackburn Rovers
Kevin Doyle – Reading, Wolverhampton Wanderers
Damien Duff – Blackburn Rovers, Chelsea, Newcastle United, Fulham
Shane Duffy – Brighton & Hove Albion
Jimmy Dunne – Burnley
Richard Dunne – Manchester City, Aston Villa
John Egan – Sheffield United
Stephen Elliott – Sunderland
Mickey Evans – Southampton
Keith Fahey – Birmingham City
Gareth Farrelly – Everton, Bolton Wanderers
Evan Ferguson – Brighton & Hove Albion
Steve Finnan – Liverpool
Curtis Fleming – Middlesbrough
Willo Flood – Manchester City
Caleb Folan – Wigan Athletic, Hull City
Dominic Foley – Watford
Kevin Foley – Wolverhampton Wanderers
Darron Gibson – Manchester United, Everton
Jon Goodman – Wimbledon
Ian Harte – Leeds United
Jeff Hendrick – Burnley, Newcastle United
Matt Holland – Ipswich Town, Charlton Athletic
Wes Hoolahan – Norwich City
Ray Houghton – Aston Villa, Crystal Palace 
Conor Hourihane – Aston Villa
Noel Hunt – Reading
Stephen Hunt – Reading, Hull City, Wolverhampton Wanderers
Adam Idah – Norwich City
Stephen Ireland – Manchester City, Aston Villa, Stoke City
Denis Irwin – Manchester United
Graham Kavanagh – Middlesbrough
Robbie Keane – Coventry City, Leeds United, Tottenham Hotspur, Liverpool, West Ham United, Aston Villa (126)
Roy Keane – Nottingham Forest, Manchester United 
Mark Kennedy – Wolverhampton Wanderers
Gary Kelly – Leeds United
Stephen Kelly – Tottenham Hotspur
Jeff Kenna – Southampton, Blackburn Rovers, Birmingham City
Andy Keogh – Wolverhampton Wanderers
Alan Kernaghan – Middlesbrough, Manchester City
Kevin Kilbane – Sunderland, Everton, Wigan Athletic, Hull City
Mark Kinsella – Charlton Athletic
Liam Lawrence – Sunderland, Stoke City
Kevin Long – Burnley
Shane Long – Reading, West Bromwich Albion, Hull City, Southampton
Jon Macken – Manchester City
Alan Mahon – Blackburn Rovers, Wigan Athletic
Jason McAteer – Liverpool, Blackburn Rovers, Sunderland
James McCarthy – Wigan Athletic, Everton
James McClean – Sunderland, West Bromwich Albion
Aiden McGeady – Everton
David McGoldrick – Sheffield United
Eddie McGoldrick – Crystal Palace
Paul McGrath – Aston Villa
Stephen McPhail – Leeds United
Paul McShane – Hull City
David Meyler – Hull City
Liam Miller – Manchester United
Kevin Moran – Blackburn Rovers
Chris Morris – Middlesbrough
Clinton Morrison – Crystal Palace, Birmingham City
Daryl Murphy – Sunderland
Michael Obafemi – Southampton
Andy O'Brien – Bradford City, Newcastle United, Bolton Wanderers
Joey O'Brien – West Ham United
Liam O'Brien – Newcastle United
John O'Shea – Manchester United, Sunderland
Andrew Omobamidele – Norwich City
Terry Phelan – Manchester City
Anthony Pilkington – Norwich City
Lee Power – Norwich City
Alan Quinn – Sheffield Wednesday
Niall Quinn – Manchester City, Sunderland
Stephen Quinn – Sheffield United, Hull City
Michael Reddy – Sunderland
Andy Reid – Tottenham Hotspur, Charlton Athletic, Sunderland
Steven Reid – Blackburn Rovers, West Bromwich Albion
Callum Robinson – Sheffield United, West Bromwich Albion
Matthew Rush – West Ham United
Conor Sammon – Wigan Athletic
John Sheridan – Sheffield Wednesday
Bernie Slaven – Middlesbrough
Steve Staunton – Aston Villa
Enda Stevens – Sheffield United
Anthony Stokes – Sunderland
Sean Thornton – Sunderland
Andy Townsend – Chelsea, Aston Villa, Middlesbrough
Andy Turner – Tottenham Hotspur
Jonathan Walters – Stoke City
Stephen Ward – Wolverhampton Wanderers, Burnley
Glenn Whelan – Stoke City
Ronnie Whelan – Liverpool
Marc Wilson – Stoke City

Romania
Florin Andone – Brighton & Hove Albion
Vlad Chiricheș – Tottenham Hotspur
Ilie Dumitrescu – Tottenham Hotspur
Ioan Viorel Ganea – Wolverhampton Wanderers
Viorel Moldovan – Coventry City
Adrian Mutu – Chelsea
Dan Petrescu – Sheffield Wednesday, Chelsea, Bradford City, Southampton (23)
Gheorghe Popescu – Tottenham Hotspur
Florin Răducioiu – West Ham United

Russia
Andrey Arshavin – Arsenal
Diniyar Bilyaletdinov – Everton
Andrei Kanchelskis – Manchester United, Everton (42)
Roman Pavlyuchenko – Tottenham Hotspur
Pavel Pogrebnyak – Fulham, Reading

Saint Kitts and Nevis
Bobby Bowry – Crystal Palace (1)

Senegal

Demba Ba – West Ham United, Newcastle United, Chelsea 
Habib Beye – Newcastle United
Henri Camara – Wolverhampton Wanderers, Southampton, Wigan Athletic
Papiss Cissé – Newcastle United
Mbaye Diagne – West Bromwich Albion
Mohamed Diamé – Wigan Athletic, West Ham United, Hull City, Newcastle United
Salif Diao – Liverpool, Stoke City
Papa Bouba Diop – Fulham
El Hadji Diouf – Liverpool, Bolton Wanderers, Blackburn Rovers
Mame Biram Diouf – Manchester United, Blackburn Rovers, Stoke City
Khalilou Fadiga – Bolton Wanderers
Abdoulaye Faye – Bolton Wanderers, Newcastle United
Amdy Faye – Charlton Athletic
Idrissa Gueye – Everton
Magaye Gueye – Everton
Diomansy Kamara – Portsmouth, West Bromwich Albion, Fulham
 Kalidou Koulibaly – Chelsea
Cheikhou Kouyaté – West Ham United, Crystal Palace, Nottingham Forest
Sadio Mané – Southampton, Liverpool (111)
Nampalys Mendy – Leicester City
Alfred N'Diaye – Hull City
Badou Ndiaye – Stoke City
Dame N'Doye – Hull City, Sunderland
M'Baye Niang – Watford
Oumar Niasse – Hull City, Everton
Henri Saivet – Newcastle United
Diafra Sakho – West Ham United
Lamine Sakho – Leeds United
Ismaïla Sarr – Watford
Ibrahima Sonko – Reading
Armand Traoré – Portsmouth

Serbia
Jovo Bosančić – Barnsley
Goran Bunjevčević – Tottenham Hotspur
Saša Ćurčić – Bolton Wanderers, Crystal Palace
Branislav Ivanović – Chelsea 
Mateja Kežman – Chelsea
Aleksandar Kolarov – Manchester City
Ognjen Koroman – Portsmouth
Darko Kovačević – Sheffield Wednesday
Lazar Marković – Liverpool, Hull City
Nemanja Matić – Chelsea, Manchester United
Nenad Milijaš – Wolverhampton Wanderers
Luka Milivojević – Crystal Palace
Savo Milošević – Aston Villa
Aleksandar Mitrović – Newcastle United, Fulham (35)
Matija Nastasić – Manchester City
Dejan Stefanović – Sheffield Wednesday, Portsmouth
Dušan Tadić – Southampton
Nemanja Vidić – Manchester United
Nikola Žigić – Birmingham City

Sierra Leone
Steven Caulker - Tottenham Hotspur, Cardiff City, Queens Park Rangers (8)
Kei Kamara – Norwich City

Slovakia
Igor Bališ – West Bromwich Albion
Vratislav Greško – Blackburn Rovers
Vladimír Kinder – Middlesbrough
Juraj Kucka – Watford
Ľubomír Michalík – Bolton Wanderers
Szilárd Németh – Middlesbrough (23)
Martin Škrtel – Liverpool
Stanislav Varga – Sunderland

Slovenia
Jon Gorenc Stanković – Huddersfield Town
Robert Koren – West Bromwich Albion, Hull City (4)

South Africa
Shaun Bartlett – Charlton Athletic
Kagisho Dikgacoi – Crystal Palace
Mark Fish – Bolton Wanderers, Charlton Athletic
Quinton Fortune – Manchester United
Mbulelo Mabizela – Tottenham Hotspur
Phil Masinga – Leeds United
Benni McCarthy – Blackburn Rovers (37)
Steven Pienaar – Everton
Eric Tinkler – Barnsley

Spain

Marcos Alonso – Bolton Wanderers, Chelsea
Xabi Alonso – Liverpool
Álvaro Arbeloa – Liverpool
Mikel Arteta – Everton, Arsenal
Daniel Ayala – Middlesbrough
Ayoze – Newcastle United, Leicester City
César Azpilicueta – Chelsea
Stefan Bajcetic – Liverpool
Héctor Bellerín – Arsenal
Bojan – Stoke City
Borja Bastón – Swansea City
Cala – Cardiff City
Víctor Camarasa – Cardiff City
Iván Campo – Bolton Wanderers
Sergi Canós – Brentford
Santi Cazorla – Arsenal
Chico – Swansea City
Diego Costa – Chelsea
Albert Crusat – Wigan Athletic
Marc Cucurella – Brighton & Hove Albion
Carlos Cuéllar – Aston Villa, Sunderland
Gerard Deulofeu – Everton, Watford
Asier del Horno – Chelsea
José Enrique – Newcastle United, Liverpool
Cesc Fàbregas – Arsenal, Chelsea
Kiko Femenía – Watford
Junior Firpo – Leeds United
Pablo Fornals – West Ham United
Javi García – Manchester City
Luis García – Liverpool
Javier Garrido – Manchester City
Carles Gil – Aston Villa
Jordi Gómez – Wigan Athletic, Sunderland
Esteban Granero – Queens Park Rangers
Pablo Hernández – Swansea City
Ander Herrera – Manchester United
Fernando Hierro – Bolton Wanderers
Pablo Ibáñez – West Bromwich Albion
Vicente Iborra – Leicester City
Jesé – Stoke City
Jonny – Wolverhampton Wanderers
Joselu – Stoke City, Newcastle United
Kepa Blanco – West Ham United
Aymeric Laporte – Manchester City
Diego Llorente – Leeds United
Fernando Llorente – Swansea City, Tottenham Hotspur
Lucas Pérez – Arsenal, West Ham United
Antonio Luna – Aston Villa
Albert Luque – Newcastle United
Javier Manquillo – Sunderland, Newcastle United
Juan Mata – Chelsea, Manchester United
Gaizka Mendieta – Middlesbrough
Fran Mérida – Arsenal
Mikel Merino – Newcastle United
Michu – Swansea City
Nacho Monreal – Arsenal
Álvaro Morata – Chelsea
Alberto Moreno – Liverpool
Fernando Morientes – Liverpool
Marc Muniesa – Stoke City
Jesús Navas – Manchester City
Nayim – Tottenham Hotspur
Álvaro Negredo – Manchester City, Middlesbrough
Nolito – Manchester City
Andrea Orlandi – Swansea City
Pedro – Chelsea
Pedro Porro – Tottenham Hotspur
Iván Ramis – Wigan Athletic
Àngel Rangel – Swansea City
Sergio Reguilón – Tottenham Hotspur
José Antonio Reyes – Arsenal
Albert Riera – Manchester City, Liverpool
Marc Roca – Leeds United
Rubén Rochina – Blackburn Rovers
Rodri – Manchester City
Rodrigo – Bolton Wanderers, Leeds United
Oriol Romeu – Southampton
Pablo Sarabia – Wolverhampton Wanderers
David Silva – Manchester City
Roberto Soldado – Tottenham Hotspur
Thiago – Liverpool
Fernando Torres – Liverpool, Chelsea (85)
Ferran Torres – Manchester City
Adama Traoré – Wolverhampton Wanderers
Diego Tristán – West Ham United
Xisco – Newcastle United
Yordi – Blackburn Rovers

Sweden
Niclas Alexandersson – Sheffield Wednesday, Everton
Marcus Allbäck – Aston Villa
Andreas Andersson – Newcastle United
Jesper Blomqvist – Manchester United, Everton
Tomas Brolin – Leeds United
Martin Dahlin – Blackburn Rovers
Erik Edman – Tottenham Hotspur
Anthony Elanga – Manchester United
Johan Elmander – Bolton Wanderers, Norwich City
Zlatan Ibrahimović – Manchester United
Klas Ingesson – Sheffield Wednesday
Alexander Isak - Newcastle United
Andreas Jakobsson – Southampton
Pontus Jansson – Brentford
Andreas Johansson – Wigan Athletic
Alexander Kačaniklić – Fulham
Emil Krafth – Newcastle United 
Dejan Kulusevski – Tottenham Hotspur
Henrik Larsson – Manchester United
Sebastian Larsson – Birmingham City, Sunderland
Anders Limpar – Everton
Victor Lindelöf – Manchester United
Freddie Ljungberg – Arsenal, West Ham United (48)
Olof Mellberg – Aston Villa
Teddy Lučić – Leeds United
Roland Nilsson – Sheffield Wednesday
Jonas Olsson – West Bromwich Albion
Martin Olsson – Blackburn Rovers, Norwich City, Swansea City
Rade Prica – Sunderland
Martin Pringle – Charlton Athletic
Stefan Schwarz – Arsenal, Sunderland
Ken Sema – Watford
Anders Svensson – Southampton
Mathias Svensson – Charlton Athletic, Norwich City
Michael Svensson – Southampton

Switzerland
Almen Abdi – Watford
Valon Behrami – West Ham United
Johan Djourou – Arsenal 
Josip Drmić – Norwich City
Gélson Fernandes – Manchester City
Marc Hottiger – Newcastle United, Everton
Pajtim Kasami – Fulham
Timm Klose – Norwich City
Fabian Schär – Newcastle United
Philippe Senderos – Arsenal, Fulham
Xherdan Shaqiri – Stoke City, Liverpool (22)
Ramon Vega – Tottenham Hotspur
Granit Xhaka – Arsenal
Reto Ziegler – Tottenham Hotspur

Tanzania
Mbwana Samatta – Aston Villa (1)

Togo
Emmanuel Adebayor – Arsenal, Manchester City, Tottenham Hotspur, Crystal Palace (97)
Floyd Ayité – Fulham

Trinidad and Tobago

Justin Hoyte – Arsenal, Sunderland
Stern John – Birmingham City, Sunderland
Kenwyne Jones – Southampton, Sunderland, Stoke City, Cardiff City
Jlloyd Samuel – Aston Villa
Jason Scotland – Wigan Athletic
Dwight Yorke – Aston Villa, Manchester United, Blackburn Rovers, Birmingham City, Sunderland (123)

Tunisia
Radhi Jaïdi – Bolton Wanderers (8)
Wahbi Khazri – Sunderland
Hatem Trabelsi – Manchester City
Yan Valery – Southampton

Turkey
Alpay – Aston Villa
Emre Belözoğlu – Newcastle United
Muzzy Izzet – Leicester City, Birmingham City (34)
Jem Karacan – Reading
Colin Kazim-Richards – Sheffield United
Nuri Şahin – Liverpool
Çağlar Söyüncü – Leicester City
Hakan Şükür – Blackburn Rovers
Cenk Tosun – Everton, Crystal Palace
Tugay – Blackburn Rovers
Tuncay – Middlesbrough, Stoke City

Ukraine
Vitaliy Mykolenko – Everton
Serhiy Rebrov – Tottenham Hotspur (10)
Andriy Shevchenko – Chelsea
Andriy Voronin – Liverpool
Andriy Yarmolenko – West Ham United
Oleksandr Zinchenko – Arsenal

United States
Brenden Aaronson – Leeds United
Jozy Altidore – Hull City, Sunderland
DaMarcus Beasley – Manchester City
Carlos Bocanegra – Fulham
Geoff Cameron – Stoke City
Jay DeMerit – Watford
Clint Dempsey – Fulham, Tottenham Hotspur (57)
Landon Donovan – Everton
Brad Friedel – Blackburn Rovers
John Harkes – Sheffield Wednesday
Stuart Holden – Bolton Wanderers
Tim Howard – Everton
Cobi Jones – Coventry City
Jovan Kirovski – Birmingham City
Eric Lichaj – Aston Villa
Brian McBride – Everton, Fulham 
Joe-Max Moore – Everton
Preki – Everton
Christian Pulisic – Chelsea
Tim Ream – Fulham
Claudio Reyna – Sunderland, Manchester City
Josh Sargent – Norwich City
Jonathan Spector – West Ham United
Roy Wegerle – Blackburn Rovers, Coventry City
DeAndre Yedlin – Newcastle United

Uruguay

Rodrigo Bentancur – Tottenham Hotspur
Miguel Britos – Watford
Edinson Cavani – Manchester United
Sebastián Coates – Liverpool
Diego Forlán – Manchester United
Diego Lugano – West Bromwich Albion
Abel Hernández – Hull City
Williams Martínez – West Bromwich Albion
Darwin Núñez - Liverpool
Walter Pandiani – Birmingham City
Adrián Paz – Ipswich Town
Gus Poyet – Chelsea, Tottenham Hotspur
Gastón Ramírez – Southampton, Middlesbrough
Darío Silva – Portsmouth
Cristhian Stuani – Middlesbrough
Luis Suárez – Liverpool (69)
Lucas Torreira – Arsenal

Venezuela
Fernando Amorebieta – Fulham
Salomón Rondón – West Bromwich Albion, Newcastle United, Everton (36)

Zambia
Patson Daka – Leicester City (9)
Enock Mwepu – Brighton & Hove Albion

Zimbabwe
Benjani – Portsmouth, Manchester City, Blackburn Rovers
Peter Ndlovu – Coventry City (34)

References

 
England
goal
Association football player non-biographical articles